The Federal Political Negotiation and Consultative Committee (abbreviated FPNCC) is an alliance and coalition of seven ethnic armed organisations (EAOs) in Myanmar seeking to negotiate with the central government. Four FPNCC members, with the exception of the United Wa State Army, National Democratic Alliance Army and the Shan State Progress Party, are also members of the Northern Alliance. FPNCC is the largest negotiating body of EAOs in the country. The Chinese government formally engages with FPNCC, which is also recognised by the Chinese government as an EAO negotiation body with the Burmese central government. 

FPNCC was established on 19 April 2017, in Pangkham, the headquarters of the United Wa State Army. FPNCC was formed in response to the failure of the United Nationalities Federal Council to generate trust among member EAOs, four of which (KIA, SSPP, MNDAA, and AA) broke away from the council. The seven founding members were all non-signatories to the Nationwide Ceasefire Agreement.  

In March 2023, in the aftermath of the 2021 Myanmar coup d'état and ongoing Myanmar civil war, FPNCC officially called on China to help defuse the internal crisis in Myanmar.

Members 
, the FPNCC's members included:

References 

Paramilitary organisations based in Myanmar
Rebel groups in Myanmar
Separatism in Myanmar
2017 establishments in Myanmar
Political party alliances in Myanmar